Muniesa is a municipality located in the province of Teruel, Aragon, Spain. According to the 2017 census (INE), the municipality had a population of 630.

Gallery

References

Municipalities in the Province of Teruel